New Malden War Memorial is a Grade II listed war memorial in the town of New Malden, Royal Borough of Kingston upon Thames, Greater London, England, commemorating local victims of the First and Second World Wars. Situated in the High Street of New Malden, in front of the erstwhile New Malden Town Hall now owned by Waitrose, New Malden War Memorial comprises a three-tiered cenotaph on a pedestal and two-stepped base.

The memorial was unveiled in a public ceremony on 8 November 1924 by Private F. Jackson of the Royal Welsh Fusiliers, who was blinded during the First World War. It was slightly damaged on 16 October 1940 after a bomb fell within  of the memorial during the Blitz. The memorial was rededicated in 1952 to honour New Malden soldiers who died during the Second World War, with more names added on 3 May 1998 in a ceremony hosted by Councillor Chrissie Hitchcock. On 27 July 2014, a new plaque was added to commemorate the centenary of the first World War. It was listed at Grade II by Historic England on 15 March 2017.

See also 
 List of public art in the Royal Borough of Kingston upon Thames

References

External links 
 

Buildings and structures completed in 1924
Grade II listed buildings in the Royal Borough of Kingston upon Thames
Grade II listed monuments and memorials
Military memorials in London
World War I memorials in England
World War II memorials in England